The Roman Catholic Diocese of São Luís de Montes Belos is a diocese centred on the city of São Luís de Montes Belos and part of the ecclesiastical province of Goiânia in Brazil.

History
It was established as the Territorial Prelature of São Luís de Montes Belos on 25 November 1961 with territory taken from the Metropolitan Archdiocese of Goiânia, the Diocese of Goiás and the Diocese of Jataí, and was entrusted to the Dutch members of the Passionist religious institute.

It became the Diocese of São Luís de Montes Belos on 4 August 1981.

Bishops

Ordinaries
 Prelate of São Luís de Montes Belos (Latin Church)
 Estanislau Arnoldo van Melis, C.P. (1962.11.26 – 1981.08.04); see below
 Bishops of São Luís de Montes Belos (Latin Church)
 Estanislau Arnoldo van Melis, C.P. (1981.08.04 – 1987.02.10); see above
 Washington Cruz, C.P. (1987.02.10 – 2002.05.08), appointed Archbishop of Goiânia, Goias
 Carmelo Scampa (2002.10.30 – 2020.01.22)
 Lindomar Rocha Mota (2020.01.22 -)

Auxiliary bishop
Rubens Augusto de Souza Espínola (1980-1985), appointed Bishop of Paranavaí, Parana

References

External links
 Diocesan website
 GCatholic.org
 Catholic Hierarchy

Roman Catholic dioceses in Brazil
Christian organizations established in 1961
São Luís de Montes Belos, Roman Catholic Diocese of
Roman Catholic dioceses and prelatures established in the 20th century
1961 establishments in Brazil